208th Division or 208th Infantry Division may refer to:

 208th Coastal Division (Italy)
 208th Division (People's Republic of China)
 208th Infantry Division (German Empire)
 208th Infantry Division (Wehrmacht)
 208th Rifle Division